The Saint Petersburg University of Economics (UNECON, SPbSUE, Saint Petersburg State University of Economics) is a public university located in Saint Petersburg, Russia. It was formed in 2012 by merging Saint Petersburg State University of Economics and Finance,  Saint Petersburg State University of Engineering and Economics, and Saint Petersburg State University of Service and Economics. The university consists of 7 faculties, 45 departments, has 1 branch and includes the College of Business and Technology.

History

Assignation Bank

In 1769, during the reign of Catherine the Great, the Assignation Bank was founded in St. Petersburg to issue and exchange banknotes in the denomination of 25, 50, 75 and 100 rubles. These notes, known as Assignation rubles, were based on the copper money then circulating in the country. In 1786, the Moscow and St. Petersburg branches merged to form the "Imperial Assignation Bank", which was allowed to perform currency exchange operations with foreign states.

In 1799–1805, the buildings of the bank also housed the Saint Petersburg Mint, which produced coinage. By 1817 the bank had issued banknotes worth 836 million rubles, and the value of these Assignation rubles declined considerably. In 1843, Assignation ruble notes were withdrawn from circulation, and replaced by the state credit notes (Russian: государственные кредитные билеты). In 1930 the building of the former Assignation Bank was granted to Leningrad Institute of Finance and Economics, the forerunner of Saint Petersburg University of Economics.

Campus 

The campus is urban and consists of 24 buildings including 6 student dormitories.

Main Building
The university's main building and the seat of the rector and administration is the building of the former Assignation Bank. The Assignation Bank was erected on Sadovaya Street, not far from Gostiny Dvor (Merchant Yard), by the decree of Catherine II of 1782.

Cast Iron Railing
The cast iron railing along Sadovaya Street constitutes one of the essential components in the overall concept, perhaps it even served a prototype for the Summer Garden lattice in the late 1770s.

Bank Bridge
The Bank Bridge over the Griboyedov Canal connects Kazansky and Spassky Islands in the central area of St. Petersburg. The bridge was named after the Assignation Bank next to it.

Faculties 
Faculty of Economics and Finance
Faculty of Humanities
Faculty of Law
Faculty of Computer Science and Applied Mathematics
Faculty of Management
Faculty of Business, Customs and Economic Security
Faculty of Service, Tourism and Hospitality

See also
ENGECON Dubai
List of higher education and academic institutions in Saint Petersburg

References

1930 establishments in the Soviet Union
Educational institutions established in 1930
2012 establishments in Russia
Business schools in Russia
Educational institutions established in 2012
Universities in Saint Petersburg
Universities of economics in Europe
Economics schools